Kyrgyzstan competed at the 2004 Summer Paralympics in Athens, Greece. The team included three athletes, all of them men, and won no medals.

Sports

Powerlifting

See also
Kyrgyzstan at the Paralympics
Kyrgyzstan at the 2004 Summer Olympics

References 

Nations at the 2004 Summer Paralympics
2004
Summer Paralympics